Vacanze a Ischia (also known as Holiday Island) is a 1957 Italian comedy film directed by Mario Camerini.

Plot
The lives of several people intersect as they go on vacation to enjoy a pleasant holiday on the island. A lawyer spends it in agitation due to thinking he caused the death of a youngster catching coins in the water by the boat.  Then you have an engineer which is insulted by four youngsters making an atrocious prank, which makes him suspect that his wife has had a fling and she is with child that is not his. Then a group of young men chasing after the women for fun, but one of them falls in love with a nurse.  There is a Frenchman who comes for a restoration of his marriage but realizes that his wife is being wooed by a young islander.

Cast 
 Vittorio De Sica: ingegnere Occhipinti 
 Isabelle Corey: Caterina Lisotto 
 Antonio Cifariello: Antonio 
 Nadia Gray: Carla Occhipinti 
 Myriam Bru: Denise Tissot 
 Paolo Stoppa: avvocato Appicciato 
 Susanne Cramer: Antonietta 
 Raf Mattioli: Salvatore 
 Peppino De Filippo: Battistella 
 Maurizio Arena: Franco 
 Bernard Dhéran: Pierre Tissot 
 Nino Besozzi: Guido Lucarelli 
 Giampiero Littera: Benito 
 Hubert von Meyerinck: Colonel Manfredi  
 Giuseppe Porelli: Judge  
 Guglielmo Inglese: Cancelliere 
 Ennio Girolami: Furio 
 Marisa Merlini

References

External links

1957 films
Films directed by Mario Camerini
1957 comedy films
Italian comedy films
Films scored by Alessandro Cicognini
1950s Italian films